Copelatus fidschiensis is a species of diving beetle. It is part of the genus Copelatus in the subfamily Copelatinae of the family Dytiscidae. It was described by Zimmermann in 1928.

References

fidschiensis
Beetles described in 1928